Heaven On My Mind is a 2018 Nigerian film directed and written by Nneka Ojor with Uche Jombo as co-witter.

Plot
The film tells a story of a young man called Ben Peter who has taken marriage as a life style and business transaction until he meets his right match called heaven.

Cast
 Adunni Ade 
 Femi Adebayo 
 Mercy Aigbe 
 Ini Edo 
 Ray Emodi 
 Swanky Jerry
 Uche Jombo 
 Eric Ogbonna 
 Princewill
 Chidi Okereke

References

External links
 

2018 films
English-language Nigerian films
2010s English-language films